Nuno Miguel Miranda de Magalhães (born 4 March 1972) is a Portuguese lawyer and politician. He is a member of the CDS – People's Party and has been a member of the Assembly of the Republic for the Setúbal District since 2005.

He was born in Luanda, Portuguese Angola and moved to Portugal in 1974 during decolonisation, and settled in Caldas da Rainha. He qualified as a lawyer in 1996.

Magalhães was elected CDS–PP parliamentary leader in June 2011 by unanimous vote from the party's 24 legislators. He was re-elected to the role several times, including again unanimously in March 2017.

In January 2012, Portuguese news sources named Magalhães as one of three parliamentary leaders who are freemasons. He said that although he is not a member of the fraternity, he attends their events with his wife, who is a member.

References

1972 births
Living people
People from Luanda
Angolan people of Portuguese descent
CDS – People's Party politicians
Members of the Assembly of the Republic (Portugal)
20th-century Portuguese lawyers
People from Caldas da Rainha